The wattled broadbill or Mindanao broadbill (Sarcophanops steerii) is a species of bird in the family Eurylaimidae where it was previously conspecific to the Visayan broadbill. It It is endemic to the islands of Mindanao, Basilan, Dinagat and Siargao in the Philippines. It is one of the most striking birds in the country with its sky-blue wattle and bill and yellow wing patch 
Its natural habitats are  tropical moist lowland forest, tropical mangrove forest, and  tropical moist shrubland. It is threatened by habitat loss.

Description and Taxonomy
Small, brightly coloured passerine of lowland and foothill forest on Mindanao and neighboring islands, with a pale blue bill and eye wattle, a black face, a streaked crown, a dark back with a white-and-yellow wingbar, a white collar, reddish rump and tail and stout appearance. Underparts are white in the female and pinkish in the male. Makes short sallies from a perched position to catch insects. Can be found in pairs, small groups, or sometimes mixed-species flocks. Unmistakable. Voice includes a plaintive whistle and a metallic “chink,” plus wing noise and bill clicks.

They are sexually dimorphic in which the males have reddish-pink bellies with the females having clean white bellies.

It is differentiated from the  Visayan broadbill with its white collar and bright yellow patch. It is also larger with sizes of 16–18 cm versus the 14–15 cm of the Visayan broadbill

Subspecies 
Two subspecies are recognized:

 Sarcophanops steerii steerii: Central and Eastern Mindanao, Siargao and Dinagat Islands; Larger and darker red on males; No recent records on Dinagat Islands
 Sarcophanops steerii mayri: Zamboanga Peninsula and Basilan; Smaller and paler red on the males; Possibly extinct on Basilan

Habitat and Conservation Status 
Its natural habitats are  tropical moist lowland primary forest and well developed secondary forest up to 750  meters above sea level.  It appears to not be able to tolerate great amounts of forest degradation. It is known to forage in the lower levels of the forest in the understory and close to the forest floor.

IUCN has assessed this bird as vulnerable with the population being estimated at 2,500 to 9,999. Extensive lowland deforestation on all islands in its range is the main threat. Most remaining lowland forest that is not afforded protection leaving it vulnerable to both legal and Illegal logging, conversion into farmlands through Slash-and-burn and mining.

This occurs in a few protected areas such as Mt. Apo, Pasonanca Natural Park and Siargao Island Protected Landscape however protection is lax.

Conservation actions proposed include to survey remaining habitat to establish its current distribution, population status and ecology. Propose sites supporting key populations for protection and ensure that proposed protected areas are gazetted and are actually protected.

References

External links
BirdLife Species Factsheet.

wattled broadbill
Endemic birds of the Philippines
Fauna of Mindanao
Fauna of Basilan
Fauna of Dinagat Islands
wattled broadbill
Taxonomy articles created by Polbot